Two kinds of replacement algorithms exist:

 Local replacement algorithm
 Page replacement algorithm